Yeung Chau is an uninhabited island of Hong Kong located in Plover Cove, Tolo Harbour, in the northwestern part of the territory. Administratively, it is part of Tai Po District.

Conservation
Yeung Chau is part of the Ma Shi Chau Special Area, together with three other islands in Tolo Harbour, namely Ma Shi Chau, Centre Island and an unnamed island located about 100 metres northeast of the shore of Yim Tin Tsai near Sam Mun Tsai New Village. The Special Area was designated in 1999.

References

External links

 "Review of Egretries in Hong Kong", in Hong Kong Biodiversity, Issue No. 14 March 2007, pp. 1-6.

Islands of Hong Kong
Tai Po District
Uninhabited islands of Hong Kong